Joseph Welles Henderson (February 6, 1890 – July 25, 1957), born in Montgomery, Pennsylvania, was acting president of Bucknell University from 1953–54.

Education

Henderson received his A.B. and master's degrees from Bucknell, and his law degree from Harvard Law School (1913).

Career
Henderson became a partner in Rawle & Henderson LLP in Philadelphia in 1917 (his fourth year at the firm). He worked in the firm's Admiralty law practice. He was a member of the Board of Philadelphia City Trusts. Henderson was the 67th president of the American Bar Association, from 1943–44, elected by a unanimous vote of the House of Delegates.

In addition to being acting president at Bucknell from 1953–54, Henderson was president of the Union League in 1955 and 1956.

References

Bucknell University people
Presidents of Bucknell University
Bucknell University alumni
Bucknell University faculty
Harvard Law School alumni
Presidents of the American Bar Association
1890 births
1957 deaths
20th-century American academics